Ali Bardakoğlu (born 1952) served as the president of the Presidency of Religious Affairs of Turkey between 2003 and 2010.

Background
Ali Bardakoğlu was born in 1952 in Tosya in the province of Kastamonu. He has been the president of the Diyanet İşleri Başkanlığı since May 2003. In 1975 he obtained a Bachelor of Arts degree in law from Istanbul University. Later he became an assistant for Islamic law at the High Islamic Institute in Kayseri. In 1982, he earned his PhD in Islamic studies from Atatürk University and taught as assistant professor at the theology faculty of the Erciyes University. From 1991 to 1992 he lived in the United Kingdom and in 1994 he visited the United States for the first time.

He is well known in Turkey and Europe as a moderate Islamic leader. He appointed, in 2005, two women from Diyanet Isleri as vice muftis (i.e. professional jurists who interpret Islamic law and counselor who help local Muslims on religious issues) for the mosques of the Turkish cities of Kayseri and Istanbul. In February 2006 he participated as an honored guest in the opening ceremony of a Protestant church in Alanya. 
He is one of the signatory Ulama of the Amman Message, which gives a broad foundation for defining Muslim orthodoxy.

He met with Pope Benedict XVI on November 28, 2006, in Ankara to help further interfaith dialog between Catholics and Muslims.

He speaks Turkish, Arabic and English. He is married and has three children.

References

External links
 diyanet.gov.tr

Turkish non-fiction writers
Turkish scientists
1952 births
People from Kastamonu
Academic staff of Erciyes University
Turkish civil servants
Living people
Turkish Sunni Muslim scholars of Islam
Turkish theologians
Presidents of Religious Affairs of Turkey
Istanbul University Faculty of Law alumni
Hanafis